Honeyball is a surname. Notable people with the surname include:

 Mary Honeyball (born 1952), British politician
 Nettie Honeyball, English footballer

English-language surnames